To Bird with Love is a live album by trumpeter Dizzy Gillespie with an array of guest stars. It was recorded at the Blue Note Jazz Club in New York City on January 23-25, 1992 and released on the Telarc label. Gillespie's performances at the club in January and February of that year yielded two additional live albums, Bird Songs: The Final Recordings and To Diz with Love. Together, these three titles represent his final recordings prior to his death in 1993.

Reception
The Allmusic review stated "The good spirits and obvious love that these musicians had for Gillespie make up for his technical lapses".

Track listing
 "Billie's Bounce" (Charlie Parker) - 15:21 
 "Bebop" (Gillespie) - 11:44 
 "Ornithology" (Benny Harris, Parker) - 10:40 
 "Anthropology" (Gillespie, Parker) - 10:56 
 "Oop-Pop-A-Da" (Babs Gonzales) - 11:21 
 "The Diamond Jubilee Blues" (Gillespie) - 1:53 
 "The Theme" (Miles Davis)- 1:25

Personnel
Dizzy Gillespie - trumpet
Antonio Hart (tracks 2-4), Paquito D'Rivera (tracks 5-7), Jackie McLean (tracks 5-7) - alto saxophone
Benny Golson (track 1), Clifford Jordan (tracks 2-4), David Sánchez (track 1) - tenor saxophone
Danilo Pérez - piano
George Mraz - bass
Kenny Washington (tracks 1 & 5-7), Lewis Nash (tracks 2-7) - drums
Bobby McFerrin - vocals (tracks 5-7)

References 

Telarc Records live albums
Dizzy Gillespie live albums
1992 live albums
Albums recorded at the Blue Note Jazz Club